Walter Edwin Drumheller (November 9, 1878 in Sunbury, Pennsylvania – May 18, 1958 in Sunbury, Pennsylvania) was an American track and field athlete who competed at the 1900 Summer Olympics in Paris, France.

Drumheller competed in the 400 metres.  He placed fifth in his first-round (semifinals) heat and did not advance to the final.  Similarly, he placed sixth or seventh in the first round semifinals of the 800 metres and did not advance to the final.

References

External links
 
 De Wael, Herman. Herman's Full Olympians: "Athletics 1900".  Accessed 18 March 2006.
 

1878 births
1958 deaths
Athletes (track and field) at the 1900 Summer Olympics
Olympic track and field athletes of the United States
American male sprinters
People from Sunbury, Pennsylvania
Sportspeople from Pennsylvania
Penn Quakers men's track and field athletes